Rena dulcis, also known commonly as the Texas blind snake, the Texas slender blind snake, or the Texas threadsnake, is a species of snake in the family Leptotyphlopidae. The species is endemic to the Southwestern United States and adjacent northern Mexico. Three subspecies are currently recognized, including the nominate subspecies described here.

Description
The Texas blind snake appears much like a shiny earthworm. It is pinkish-brown (puce) in color with a deep sheen to its scales. It appears not to be segmented. The eyes are no more than two dark dots under the head scales. Unique among snakes, their upper jaws contain no teeth, and the lower jaw is incredibly short (less than half the length of the skull). When ingesting prey, the snakes flex the front of their short lower jaw quickly in a raking motion to fling prey into their esophagus.

On the top of the head, between the ocular scales, L. dulcis has three scales (L. humilis has one scale).

Behavior
The Texas blind snake spends the vast majority of its time buried in loose soil, only emerging to feed or when it rains and its habitat floods with water. It is often found after spring rains and mistaken for an earthworm. If handled it usually squirms around and tries to poke the tip of its tail into the handler. This is a completely harmless maneuver and likely serves as a distractive measure. The mouth is far too small to effectively bite a human being.

Commensal behavior has been observed with the eastern screech owl in which the owl carries live Texas blind snakes back to the nest, where the snakes help to clean the nest of parasites.

Diet
The diet of R. dulcis consists primarily of termite and ant larvae.

Reproduction
Rena dulcis is oviparous.

Common names
Common names for R. dulcis include the following: burrowing snake, eastern worm snake, plains blind snake, Texas blind snake, Texas Rena, Texas slender blind snake, Texas threadsnake, Texas worm snake, worm snake.

Geographic range
Rena dulcis is found in the southwestern United States and northern Mexico. In the USA it occurs in southwestern Kansas, western Oklahoma including the panhandle, central and southern Texas, west through southern New Mexico to southeastern Arizona. In northern Mexico it has been reported in Chihuahua, Coahuila, Tamaulipas, Nuevo León, San Luis Potosí, Veracruz, Querétaro, Hidalgo, and Puebla.

The type locality given by Baird and Girard is "Between San Pedro and Camanche [sic] Springs, Tex." (Comanche Springs, Texas).

Conservation
Gauging wild blind snake populations is virtually impossible due to their secretive nature. However, like many other native Texas species, R. dulcis is known to be detrimentally affected by the red imported fire ant.

Subspecies
The following three subspecies are recognized as being valid.
Rena dulcis dulcis 
Rena dulcis rubellum 
Rena dulcis supraorbicularis 

Nota bene: A trinomial authority in parentheses indicates that the subspecies was originally described in a genus other than Rena.

References

Further reading
Adalsteinsson SA, Branch WR, Trape S, Vitt LJ, Hedges SB (2009). "Molecular phylogeny, classification, and biogeography of snakes of the family Leptotyphlopidae (Reptilia, Squamata)". Zootaxa 2244: 1-50. 
Baird SF, Girard CF (1853). Catalogue of North American Reptiles in the Museum of the Smithsonian Institution. Part I.—Serpents. Washington, District of Columbia: Smithsonian Institution. xvi + 172 pp. (Rena dulcis, new species, pp. 142–143).
Behler JL, King FW (1979). The Audubon Society Field Guide to North American Reptiles and Amphibians. New York: Alfred A. Knopf. 743 pp. . (Leptotyphlops dulcis, pp. 583–584 + Plate 464).
Boulenger GA (1893). Catalogue of the Snakes in the British Museum (Natural History). Volume I., Containing the Families ... Glauconiidæ ... London: Trustees of the British Museum (Natural History). (Taylor and Francis, printers). xiii + 448 pp. + Plates I–XXVIII. (Glauconia dulcis, p. 65).
Conant R (1975). A Field Guide to Reptiles and Amphibians of Eastern and Central North America, Second Edition. Boston: Houghton Mifflin. xviii + 429 pp. + Plates 1-48.  (hardcover),  (paperback). (Leptotyphlops dulcis, pp. 137–138, Figure 31 + Plate 33 + Map 122).
Goin CJ, Goin OB, Zug GR (1978). Introduction to Herpetology, Third Edition. San Francisco: W.H. Freeman and Company. xi + 378 pp. . (Leptotyphlops dulcis, p. 313). 
Hahn DE (1979). "Leptotyphlops dulcis (Baird and Girard) Texas blind snake". Catalogue of American Amphibians and Reptiles 231: 1-2.
Heimes, Peter (2016). Snakes of Mexico: Herpetofauna Mexicana Vol. I. Frankfurt am Main, Germany: Chimaira. 572 pp. .
Klauber LM (1940). "The Worm Snakes of the Genus Leptotyphlops in the United States and northern Mexico". Trans. San Diego Soc. Nat. Hist. 9: 87-162.
Powell R, Conant R, Collins JT (2016). Peterson Field Guide to Reptiles and Amphibians of Eastern and Central North America, Fourth Edition. Boston and New York: Houghton Mifflin Harcourt. xiv + 494 pp., 47 plates, 207 figures. . (Rena dulcis, pp. 361–362, Figure 172 + Plate 32).
Schmidt KP, Davis DD (1941). Field Book of Snakes of the United States and Canada. New York: G.P. Putnam's Sons. 365 pp. (Leptotyphlops dulcis, pp. 93–94).
Stebbins RC (2003). A Field Guide to Western Reptiles and Amphibians, Third Edition. The Peterson Field Guide Series ®. Boston and New York: Houghton Mifflin. xiii + 533 pp. . (Leptotyphlops dulcis, p. 341 + Figure 19 on p. 118 + Map 128).

External links

Leptotyphlops dulcis, Texas Blind Snake at DigiMorph.
Leptotyphlops dulcis at Life is Short but Snakes are Long

dulcis
Reptiles of the United States
Reptiles of Mexico
Reptiles described in 1853
Taxa named by Spencer Fullerton Baird
Taxa named by Charles Frédéric Girard